Presidential elections were held in Honduras in January 1866. The result was a victory for José María Medina.

Results
Medina won the popular vote, and was subsequently appointed president by Congress.

References

Honduras
1866 in Honduras
Presidential elections in Honduras
Election and referendum articles with incomplete results